Mormo cyanea is a moth of the family Noctuidae. It is found in Japan.

References 

Hadeninae
Moths described in 1982
Insects of Japan